The Visegrad Patent Institute (VPI) is an intergovernmental organization for cooperation in the field of patents, created by the national patent offices of the four Visegrad countries, namely the Czech Republic, Hungary, Poland and Slovakia. The Agreement on the Visegrad Patent Institute (VPI Agreement) was signed in Bratislava on February 26, 2015. The Institute acts as an International Searching Authority (ISA) and International Preliminary Examining Authorities (IPEA) under the Patent Cooperation Treaty (PCT).

According to Slovak Foreign Affairs Minister Miroslav Lajčák, the signature of the agreement on creating the Visegrad Patent Institute was an important milestone in the history of the Visegrád Group, the alliance between Czech Republic, Hungary, Poland and Slovakia.

See also
Nordic Patent Institute
Polish Patent Office

References

Further reading

External links

Intergovernmental organizations
Patent offices
International Searching and Preliminary Examining Authorities
Foreign relations of the Czech Republic
Foreign relations of Hungary
Foreign relations of Poland
Foreign relations of Slovakia
Central Europe
Czechoslovakia–Poland relations
Czech Republic–Poland relations
Czechoslovakia–Hungary relations
Poland–Slovakia relations
2015 in Europe